Charles W. Porter (July 11, 1849 – August 1, 1891) was an attorney and public official who served as Secretary of State of Vermont.

Biography
Charles Walcott Porter  was born in Hartford, Vermont on July 11, 1849; he was the son of Judge John Porter (1798–1888) and Jane F. Foster (1811–1900).  Porter was educated in Hartford, and then graduated from Kimball Union Academy in New Hampshire and Phillips Andover Academy in Massachusetts.

After completing his education, Porter moved to Montpelier, where he studied law with Benjamin F. Fifield, and was admitted to the bar.  He practiced in partnership with Fifield and Clarence H. Pitkin; after Fifield retired, Pitkin and Porter practiced together until 1880, after which Porter carried on his own practice.  From 1887 until his death, he was president of the Berlin Granite Company.

A Republican, Porter was Vermont's Deputy Secretary of State from 1872 to 1884.  In 1884, longtime incumbent George Nichols retired, and Porter became Secretary of State.  He served until 1890, when he was an unsuccessful candidate for renomination.

Death and burial
Porter died at the home of his brother in law in New Bedford, Massachusetts on August 1, 1891.  He had been ill for more than a year, and traveled extensively in an effort to restore his health.  Physicians diagnosed him with malaria, though they were unable to determine how he had contracted it or when.  He was buried at Green Mount Cemetery in Montpelier.

Family
In 1885, Porter married Florence B. Bailey, the daughter of Charles W. and Olive E. Bailey of Montpelier.

References

Sources

Books

Newspapers

External links

1849 births
1891 deaths
People from Hartford, Vermont
People from Montpelier, Vermont
Phillips Academy alumni
Vermont lawyers
Vermont Republicans
Secretaries of State of Vermont
Burials at Green Mount Cemetery (Montpelier, Vermont)
19th-century American lawyers